Michael Thomson is a Scottish actor, best known for his portrayal of nurse and transplant coordinator Jonny Maconie in the medical drama Holby City.

Early life and career
Thomson was born in Edinburgh, Scotland. When Thomson was a pupil at James Gillespie's High School, Janie McGill, his teacher,  spotted his acting potential and told his mother that he could have a future as an actor. Thomson went to the National Youth Theatre in London when he was young. Thomson trained at the London Academy of Music and Dramatic Art for three years. During his early career, he worked on building sites and as a charity mugger.

After Thomson finished the theatrical production A Round-Heeled Woman in the West End of London, he auditioned for the part of Jonny Maconie on Holby City. Two auditions were held and he got the role. Thomson made his first appearance on Holby City on 15 May 2012. Thomson underwent research for the role, including taking a tour of a hospital and meeting patients there. On 26 November 2012 he appeared on Lorraine, talking to Lorraine Kelly about a storyline in Holby City.

Personal life
Thomson is in a relationship with Natasha Rickman, an actress who graduated from the Royal Academy of Dramatic Art. He has four brothers and one sister.

Filmography

Television and film

Theatre

References

External links

Scottish male television actors
Alumni of the London Academy of Music and Dramatic Art
People educated at James Gillespie's High School
20th-century births
Living people
Year of birth uncertain
Male actors from Edinburgh
National Youth Theatre members